Lalrozama Fanai (born 30 November 1991) is an Indian professional footballer who most recently played as a defender for East Bengal FC in the I-League.

Career

Youth
Born in Aizawl, Mizoram, Fanai started playing football as a school-team player before joining Mizo club, Bawngkawn, where he played in the local leagues till 2004. In 2005, Fanai joined the Mohun Bagan-SAIL Academy where he stayed till 2007. While with the Mohun Bagan Academy, Fanai was a part of the side that won the Indian zone of the Manchester United Premier Cup before qualifying for the final rounds in Manchester.

In 2007, Fanai signed for Pune in which he was a youth player for them from 2007 to 2010.

Pailan Arrows
In 2010, Fanai signed with newly created Pailan Arrows (then AIFF XI) of the I-League. On 3 December 2010 Fanai played in his first professional match in the league against Chirag United which was also the first league match Pailan Arrows history as the club lost 2–1.

On 23 October 2011 Fanai scored a goal against Mohun Bagan in a league match at the Salt Lake Stadium in which he found the net in the 8th minute to give his side the lead before losing 3–1.

Mohun Bagan
For the 2012–13 season Fanai signed with Mohun Bagan, the club he spent some of his youth days with. Fanai made his debut for Mohun Bagan in the league on 6 October 2012 against Shillong Lajong on the first match of the season in which he started and played the full 90 minutes as Lajong won the match 2–0.

Bengaluru FC
For the 2013–14 season it was announced that Fanai had signed with new direct-entry side Bengaluru FC. He made his debut for the team on 1 December 2013 in the I-League against Shillong Lajong at the Bangalore Football Stadium. He came on in the 24th minute for Keegan Pereira as Bengaluru FC won the match 2–1.

Aizawl
After leaving Bengaluru FC, Fanai joined I-League 2nd Division side Aizawl. After the side gained promotion to the I-League, it was announced that Fanai would not be re-signed by the club.

Fateh Hyderabad
Fanai played for Fateh Hyderabad A.F.C. in 2016–17 I-League 2nd Division.

Aizawl
He was signed by Aizawl F.C. for 2017–18 I-League.

International
During the 2007–08 season, Fanai was called up to the India U19 side but he did not have a passport at the time so he could not play for the side. Fanai's first U19 tournament was the 2010 AFC U-19 qualifiers in Iraq.

He also played with the India U23 side during the 2010 Asian Games in which he played in one match.

Career statistics

References

1991 births
Living people
People from Aizawl
Indian footballers
Indian Arrows players
Mohun Bagan AC players
Bengaluru FC players
Aizawl FC players
Association football defenders
Footballers from Mizoram
I-League players
I-League 2nd Division players
India youth international footballers
Footballers at the 2010 Asian Games
Asian Games competitors for India